KERU-FM (88.5 FM) is a bilingual radio station licensed to Blythe, California, and is an affiliate of the Spanish Public Radio network. The station was owned by Escuela de la Raza Unida until June 2016, when the school transferred ownership to the station's managers. The 100-watt station began broadcasting in 1983.

References

External links

ERU-FM
Blythe, California
Mass media in Riverside County, California
Radio stations established in 1983
1983 establishments in California